Topolovgrad is a town in south-central Bulgaria, part of Haskovo Province, situated at the northern foot of the Sakar Mountain. It is the administrative centre of the homonymous Topolovgrad Municipality.

Etymology
Until 1934 the town was known as Kavakli, a name deriving from the Turkish word kavak, "poplar", under this name it was also known by its Greek inhabitants.

History
Topolovgrad and the surrounding area have been inhabited since ancient times, as evidenced by the dolmens found at Hlyabovo and the Paleokastro fortress that may have been built by the Thracians.

Until the early 20th century, the town was predominantly inhabited by Greeks (96 percent) and hosted Greek schools and churches. Although a Greek majority town, after 1906, the Bulgarian government appointed the first Bulgarian mayor. From 1906 to 1925, about 22,000 Greeks left the town and its surroundings and settled in Greek Macedonia. They were replaced by groups of Bulgarian refugees from Western Thrace, Eastern Thrace, Asia Minor and Macedonia.

People 

 Krum Krumov - writer and philologist
 Delko Karadelkov - chairman, Bulgarian Journalists' Union, 1976
 Evelin Banev "Brendo" - self-made businessman, wrestler

Gallery

References

Towns in Bulgaria
Populated places in Haskovo Province